Astrid Allwyn (born Astrid Christofferson; November 27, 1905 – March 31, 1978) was an American stage and film actress.

Early years
Allwyn was born in South Manchester, Connecticut, part of a family that included four sisters and a brother. When she was three years old, her family moved to Springfield, Massachusetts.

At age 13, she sang well enough in a concert to be offered a scholarship to the Boston Conservatory of Music, but she declined rather than move away from her home. After finishing high school, she moved to New York, hoping for a career as a concert singer, but she ended up taking classes at a business college and becoming a typist for a business on Wall Street.

Career
Allwyn studied dancing and dramatics in New York and later joined a stock company. Allwyn made her Broadway debut in 1929 in Elmer Rice's Street Scene. On the strength of her performance in Once in a Lifetime, she was given film work. She signed with Metro-Goldwyn-Mayer and began her screen career.

In films, she often played the woman from whom the male star escaped, for example Charles Boyer's character's fiancée in the 1939 version of Love Affair or James Stewart's mentor's daughter in Mr. Smith Goes to Washington.

Personal life
Her first husband was actor Robert Kent; the two appeared together in the 1936 Shirley Temple film Dimples. They married on January 10, 1937, in Tijuana, Mexico, and were divorced in 1941. She remained married to second spouse Charles O. Fee until her death in 1978, at age 72. Two of their daughters, Melinda and Vicki, also became actresses.

Death
On March 31, 1978, Allwyn died of cancer in Los Angeles, California.

Complete filmography

West of Broadway (1931) - Young woman (uncredited)
Lady with a Past (1932) - Lola
Love Affair (1932) - Linda Lee
 The Night Mayor (1932) - Patsy
Hat Check Girl (1932) - A Party Guest (uncredited)
The Girl From Calgary (1932) - Mazie Williams
Bachelor Mother (1932) - Lola Butler
The Iron Master (1933) - Flo Lancert
Hello, Sister! (1933) - Webster's Secretary
He Couldn't Take It (1933) - Blonde
Only Yesterday (1933) - (uncredited)
All of Me (1934) - Ray (uncredited)
Beggars in Ermine (1934) - Mrs. Vivian Dawson
Mystery Liner (1934) - Lila Kane
Monte Carlo Nights (1934) - Blondie Roberts
Servants' Entrance (1934) - Sigrid Hansen
The White Parade (1934) - Gertrude Mack
One More Spring (1935) - Girl at Auction
The Great Hotel Murder (1935) - Nora, Bookstand Girl (uncredited)
It's a Small World (1935) - Nancy Naylor
Dante's Inferno (1935) - Girl in Stoke-Hold (uncredited)
Accent on Youth (1935) - Genevieve Lang
Ladies Love Danger (1935) - Chorus Girl (uncredited)
Way Down East (1935) - Kate
Hands Across the Table (1935) - Vivian Snowden
Charlie Chan's Secret (1936) - Janice Gage
It Had to Happen (1936) - Mabel Spears (scenes cut)
Follow the Fleet (1936) - Mrs. Iris Manning
Star for a Night (1936) - Josephine Hall
Dimples (1936) - Cleo Marsh
Flying Hostess (1936) - Phyllis Crawford
Stowaway (1936) - Kay Swift
Woman-Wise (1937) - "Bubbles" Carson
Murder Goes to College (1937) - Greta Barry
Venus Makes Trouble (1937) - Iris Randall
It Could Happen to You (1937) - Angela
Love Takes Flight (1937) - Diane Audre
The Westland Case (1937) - Miss Brentino
International Crime (1938) - Phoebe Lane
Love Affair (1939) - Lois Clarke
Miracles for Sale (1939) - Mrs. Zelma La Claire
Honeymoon in Bali (1939) - Fortune Teller at Egret Room
Mr. Smith Goes to Washington (1939) - Susan Paine
Reno (1939) - Flora McKenzie
The Lone Wolf Strikes (1940) - Binnie Weldon
Gangs of Chicago (1940) - Virginia Brandt
The Leather Pushers (1940) - Pat Danbury
Meet the Missus (1940) - Violet Stevens
City of Missing Girls (1941) - Nora Page
Melody for Three (1941) - Gladys McClelland
The Hard-Boiled Canary (1941) - Girl (uncredited)
Puddin' Head (1941) - Yvonne Jones
Cracked Nuts (1941) - Ethel Mitchell
Unexpected Uncle (1941) - Sara Cochran
No Hands on the Clock (1941) - Gypsy Toland
Hit Parade of 1943 (1943) - Joyce Germaine

References

External links

1905 births
1978 deaths
20th-century American actresses
American film actresses
American stage actresses
Actresses from Connecticut
Deaths from cancer in California
People from Manchester, Connecticut
Burials at Forest Lawn Memorial Park (Glendale)
20th-century American singers